Hoplostethus fedorovi is a small deep-sea fish species belonging to the slimehead family (Trachichthyidae).

Distribution
It is found in the Western Central Pacific (a holotype from the Marcus-Necker ridge).

Environment
Hoplostethus fedorovi is recorded to be found within a marine environment within a bathypelagic or benthypelagic depth range.  This species is occupied in the depth range of about 500 – 520 meters. They are commonly known to be a deep water species.

Size
Hoplostethus fedorovi was can reach the maximum recorded length of about 15.9 centimeters or about 6.25 inches as an unsexed male.

Threats
Hoplostethus fedorovi serves as no threat to humans. They are recorded to be a harmless species.

References

fedorovi
Fish described in 1986